Trijueque is a municipality located in the province of Guadalajara, Castile-La Mancha, Spain. According to the 2004 census (INE), the municipality has a population of 909 inhabitants.

This town was the scenario of violent battles during the Battle of Guadalajara in the Spanish Civil War.

References

 Hugh Thomas, The Spanish Civil War, Modern Library, 2001, 
 Antony Beevor, The Battle for Spain, Orion, 1982 revised 2006, 

Municipalities in the Province of Guadalajara